is a Japanese footballer currently playing as a midfielder for Matsue City, on loan from Gainare Tottori.

Career statistics

Club
.

Notes

References

External links

Profile at Gainare Tottori

1999 births
Living people
Association football people from Okayama Prefecture
Japanese footballers
Association football midfielders
J3 League players
Gainare Tottori players
Matsue City FC players